The central tegmental tract is a structure in the midbrain and pons.

 The central tegmental tract includes ascending axonal fibers that arise from the rostral nucleus solitarius and terminate in the ventral posteromedial nucleus (VPM) of thalamus.  Information from the thalamus will go to cortical taste area, namely the insula and frontal operculum.
 It also contains descending axonal fibers from the parvocellular red nucleus.  The descending axons will project to the inferior olivary nucleus.  This latter pathway (the rubro-olivary tract) will be used to connect the contralateral cerebellum.

Lesion of the tract can cause palatal myoclonus, e.g. in myoclonic syndrome, in strokes of the Posterior Inferior Cerebellar Artery.

Additional Images

References

External links
 Midbrain at Inferior Colliculus - IV Nucleus, Sectional Atlas
 Mid Pons at the Trigeminal Motor Nucleus, Sectional Atlas
 Neuroanatomy / plate12, Frank Willard

Central nervous system pathways
Brainstem